Sawdust and Tinsel is a 1953 Swedish drama film directed by Ingmar Bergman.

Plot
In Sawdust and Tinsel, Bergman depicts the battle between sexes as a grotesque carnival of humiliation. Set in the turn of the twentieth-century Sweden, the story begins in the outdoor area of the circus, where the clown Frost (Anders Ek) is informed that a beautiful lady is bathing nude in the sea near the coast where the circus is set. He later finds out that the lady is his wife and he tries to cover her up by blocking her body with his. We are then introduced to the circus owner and ringmaster Albert Johansson (Åke Grönberg) and his young mistress, Anne (Harriet Andersson) who is the horseback rider of the circus.
		 	
The circus members advertise by marching in the street, but a police officer stops them. When asked for a permit, they play around and humiliate the police, leading to the confiscation of several of their horses. Later, in the main circus tent, they talk about their financial situation and the fate of the circus. Albert and Anne are having problems, as it appears that Albert has gotten tired of the circus and Anne, and wants to go back to his wife and child whom he left three years ago.

Out of desperation, Albert and Anne try to preserve the circus by meeting a theatre director, Mr. Sjuberg (Gunnar Björnstrand), and begging him for assistance. Mr. Sjuberg insults Albert and his wife's appearances which he believed looked ridiculous and overdressed, but he lets them borrow some clothes. When asked for the payment, Mr. Sjuberg says that it would be paid by seeing one of their performances.

In the theatre, Anne meets Frans (Hasse Ekman) who lusts for her, and constantly flirts with her, but Anne rejects him. When Anne and Albert go back to their trailer, she begs him not to leave her and to marry her instead. Albert is still determined to go back to his wife, Agda (Annika Tretow). When he goes to Agda's house and has a retrospective conversation, he reveals that he is in a dire financial situation and would like to sell out the circus and help her out with her shop. He begs to stay the night, but she asks him to leave.

Meanwhile, the desperate Anne goes to the theatre to meet Frans. They have a teasing conversation which leads to arm wrestling; he beats her at it and then wrestles her to the ground. He tells her about an amulet which was given to him by a grateful woman, saying that Anne could sell the amulet and live off the money for a year. He offers the amulet to her if she has sexual intercourse with him, and also refuses to let her leave until she does. After they have sex, she walks into a shop and is seen by Albert.

The enraged Albert confronts Anne in the trailer. At first, she lies but after he endeavors in trying to get the truth out of her, she admits that she had sex with Frans, saying that he "practically raped" her. The conversation is interrupted when Frost goes into the trailer drunk and Albert joins him, Albert schemes to shoot the bear. He goes out of the trailer and shouts in a crazed manner.

They prepare for a circus performance playing shortly. After a clown act, Anne begins her horseback riding that is constantly interrupted by Frans's catcalling, he is sitting in the front and part of the audience. One of the audience members throws a rock at the horse, this disruption of the performance gives a chance for Albert to whip Frans's forehead. Frans goes into the ring and slaps Albert's face. Mr. Sjuberg who was invited earlier, starts a fight between the two, an honorable one without whips or tools. Albert and Frans brawl. Albert falls down and attempts to grab onto Frans's legs but fails, and Albert ultimately loses. Frost and other circus member stop the fight and Anne cries and hits Frans.
 
That night, Albert contemplates suicide and puts a gun to his head. Everyone is concerned as he had locked himself up and would not open up the door. Frost and his wife, Alma, try to comfort Albert, who later goes to the cage and shoots the bear. He goes into a horse shed and weeps. When a circus member comes over, he screams at him and orders him to prepare to move the circus. In the end, they travel out of the setting and Albert and Anne both stare at each other.

Cast
 Åke Grönberg as Albert Johansson
 Harriet Andersson as Anne
 Hasse Ekman as Frans
 Anders Ek as Frost
 Gudrun Brost as Alma
 Annika Tretow as Agda
 Erik Strandmark as Jens
 Gunnar Björnstrand as Mr. Sjuberg
 Curt Löwgren as Blom

Reception
It has a 100% approval rating from 9 reviews listed at Rotten Tomatoes, with an average rating of 8/10. The film ranked 6th on Cahiers du Cinéma's Top 10 Films of the Year List in 1957. In 2012 it was voted one of the 25 best Swedish films of all time. The film was shown as part of an Ingmar Bergman Retrospective at the 61st Berlin International Film Festival in 2011.

References

External links
 
 
 
 
Sawdust and Tinsel: The Lower Depths an essay by John Simon at the Criterion Collection

1953 films
1953 drama films
Swedish black-and-white films
Circus films
Films directed by Ingmar Bergman
Films with screenplays by Ingmar Bergman
Swedish drama films
1950s Swedish-language films
1950s Swedish films